Madrellidae is a family of nudibranchs, marine gastropod molluscs, in the clade Nudipleura. There are no subfamilies in Madrellidae.

Genera
Genera and species within the family Madrellidae include:
 Madrella
 Madrella aurantiaca Vayssière, 1902
Madrella ferruginosa Alder & Hancock, 1864
Madrella gloriosa Baba, 1949
Madrella sanguinea (Angas, 1864)
 Eliotia
 Eliotia souleyeti Vayssière, 1909

References
Sea Slug Forum species list